Peter C. Bishop is a professional futurist (futurologist), a retired Associate Professor of Strategic Foresight, and the former Director of the graduate program in Futures Studies at the University of Houston.

Early career 

In 1968, Bishop received a bachelor's degree in philosophy from St. Louis University where he also studied mathematics and physics. He grew up in St. Louis, Missouri where he was a member of the Society of Jesus (Jesuits) for seven years. From Michigan State University, he received an M.A. (sociology) in 1971 and a Ph.D. (sociology) in 1974. Bishop started teaching at Georgia Southern College (now Georgia Southern University) in 1973 where he specialized in social problems and political sociology.

Professional career 

Bishop came to the University of Houston in 2005, after having taught futures studies at the University of Houston–Clear Lake since 1982. Specializing in techniques for long term forecasting and planning, he has published a book on the subject, Thinking about the Future: Guidelines for Strategic Foresight, with co-author Andy Hines. He delivers keynote addresses and conducts seminars on the future for business, government and not-for-profit organizations. He also facilitates groups in developing scenarios, visions and strategic plans for the future. Bishop's clients include IBM, the NASA Johnson Space Center, Nestlé USA, Tetra Pak, the Shell Pipeline Corporation, the Defense and Central Intelligence Agencies, the Lawrence Livermore National Laboratory, the W.K. Kellogg Foundation, the Texas Department of Transportation, the California Environmental Protection Agency, and the Center for Houston’s Future. He is a founding board member of the Association of Professional Futurists, and is president of his own firm, Strategic Foresight and Development, which offers education and training in futures thinking and techniques to the corporate market.

Director, Graduate Program in Futures Studies, University of Houston, 2005–2013
Chair, Graduate Program in Studies of the Future, University of Houston–Clear Lake, 1983–1996, 1998–2005
Executive Director, Institute for Futures Research, University of Houston–Clear Lake, 1990–2005
President, Strategic Foresight and Development, 2001–present
Board Member, Association of Professional Futurists, 	2001–2007
Planning officer, NASA Mid-Continent Technology Transfer Center, 1992–1996
Founder and Director, Space Business Research Center, 1986–1990
Founding member, UHCL Research Institute for Computing and Information Sciences, 1985–1992
Founder and First President, TX Council of Faculty Governance Organizations, 1978–1981

References

External links 
Biography: Peter C. Bishop
University of Houston: Foresight Program
Program: Foresight Students and Alumni

1944 births
Living people
American futurologists
University of Houston faculty